Master of Styles is a studio album by alternative rock band The Urge, released in 1998. The album produced three singles (“Jump Right In”, “Straight to Hell”, and “Closer”) and sold 250,000 copies. “Jump Right In” featured guest vocals by Nick Hexum of 311 and hit the #10 position on the Modern Rock list.

Critical reception
The Washington Post wrote that "Urge seems to have a chameleonic talent for adapting to punk, ska, reggae, hip-hop and reggae trends without ever distinguishing itself." MTV wrote that "any group that can throw funk, ska, pop and metal into the old mixmaster (accent on old) without any discernible recipe for making it all work to their commercial benefit is nothing if not adaptable." CMJ New Music Monthly opined that the band "combines sounds from funk to punk to reggae, and it's successful thanks in large part to the one constant: the mellifluous, adaptable voice of Steve Ewing."

Track listing

Personnel

The Urge
Steve Ewing - vocals
Karl Grable - bass, concept
Jerry Jost - guitars
John Pessoni - drums, background vocals
Bill Reiter - saxophone
Matt Kwiatkowski - trombone
Todd Painter - trombone, keyboard

Additional musicians
Nick Hexum - vocals in "Jump Right In"

Additional personnel
Mike Dillon - percussion
Doug Erb - art direction
GGGarth - engineer, producer
Mr. Colson - engineer
Tom Gordon - assistant engineer
Steve Hupaylo - unknown contributor
Michael Lavine - photography
Bob Ludwig - mastering
Luke Partridge	- design
Joe Gastwirt- Mastering on Jump right in.
Randy Staub - mixing
Joe Varkey - assistant engineer
Gary Winger - mixing assistant

Charts

References

The Urge albums
Albums produced by Garth Richardson
1998 albums